DXMT may refer to:
 Caffeine synthase, an enzyme
 DXMT, former callsign of DXOW, an AM radio station in the Philippines